A sønderjysk kaffebord (English: Southern Jutland Coffee table) consists of various types of cakes, served on a table with coffee.

After southern Jutland became part of Prussia in 1864, many national meetings were held, but the Prussian authorities did not always grant liquor to the taverns where the Danish-minded met. Therefore, assembly houses were built where the Danish-minded could hold meetings. Here, coffee and cakes were served, and the participants brought home baked goods, which filled up well on the long tables. There was fierce competition between the women to bake the most tasty and eye-catching cakes. Pies or layer cakes were the test stone of any skilled housewife's skill. The tradition flourished again during World War II, when it was forbidden to hold meetings but not to hold coffee tables, so the Southerners used this hole in the law to meet legally.

The large coffee table flourished especially in the self-contained farm stand, where there was plenty of eggs, sugar, flour, cream - and more. The large cake offering was created during a time of hard physical work and spartan everyday food. Therefore, it felt festive to dish out the full coffee table at all year's parties and big events, and it should preferably be so plentiful that twice as many people could be invited. New team guests were often invited the following days. One of the reasons why coffee tables in Southern Jutland seemed more voluminous than in the rest of the country was due to the special serving technique that was also maintained in private homes until well into the 20th century: the cake dishes were sent around one after another and the participants piled up on the side plate three or four different kinds.

References 

Danish cuisine